Inspector Vikram may refer to:
 Inspector Vikram (1989 film), an Indian Kannada-language comedy thriller film
 Inspector Vikram (2021 film), an Indian Kannada-language action film